Pusté Pole is a village and municipality in Stará Ľubovňa District in the Prešov Region of northern Slovakia.

History
In historical records the village was first mentioned in 1325.

Geography
The municipality lies at an altitude of 530 metres and covers an area of 19.608 km². It has a population of about 1544 people.

External links
http://www.statistics.sk/mosmis/eng/run.html

Villages and municipalities in Stará Ľubovňa District